Tony Maserati is an American record producer and audio engineer specializing in mixing. He was involved in the development of the New York R&B and hip-hop scene in the 1990s, working with Mary J. Blige, Notorious B.I.G., Puff Daddy, and Queen Latifah. Since then he has worked on Grammy nominated projects with The Black Eyed Peas, Beyoncé (who he won Best R&B Album with on her 2003 Dangerously in Love), Jason Mraz, Robin Thicke, and Usher. Maserati won a Latin Grammy in 2006 for his work on Sérgio Mendes’s Timeless. He has been nominated for a total of 10 Grammys, with four for Best Engineered Album, Non-Classical.

Early life 
Maserati began college at Northeastern University before transferring to Boston’s Berklee College of Music in the early 1980s. He originally majored in Composition, but switched to the Music Production and Engineering major when it was first offered in 1983. While at Berklee, he learned to mix by doing the sound for the Marsells. He graduated with an MA in 1986.

Career

New York Hip-Hop and R&B 
Maserati went to work in New York City at Sigma Sound Studios where he assisted Glenn Rosenstein. Rosenstein introduced him to Full Force, who helped Maserati learn to arrange and mix. While at Sigma Sound he worked with Whitney Houston and James Brown, and was able to mix his first song, Samantha Fox’s “Naughty Girls (Need Love Too).” He credits much of the musical sound he developed on his work at Berklee and the influence of Full Force.

In 1989, Maserati went independent, specializing in mixing, setting him apart at the time since most musical engineers focused on production. During his time at Sigma Sound, Maserati had befriended studio managers around the city, and he contacted them requesting work on R&B and Hip-Hop. While most mixers worked on rock, Maserati claims he focused on R&B and Hip-Hop because it “was the only place where innovation was happening.”

Maserati was introduced to Puff Daddy in the early-90s through the producer Devante Swing. Puff Daddy brought Maserati into Bad Boy Records and, Maserati claims, Puff Daddy “locked me down” for the following six years. As a result, Maserati worked with every major New York R&B and hip-hop artist of the 1990s, including mixing albums for Busta Rhymes, Mary J. Blige, The Notorious B.I.G., Faith Evans, and Queen Latifah. Maserati regards these years as very collaborative, and he allowed the various artists to work with his analogue equipment to help develop their desired sound. According to Mix magazine, Maserati provided the definitive sound of New York hip-hop in the form of heavy bass lines while also providing high fidelity sounds on the other end of the scale. According to Sound on Sound, the result was a "huge low end and a smooth, velvety high," and which Mix labelled an “outhouse on the bottom, penthouse on the top.”

The success of the New York R&B and hip-hop sound propelled Maserati into a widely known and well-established mixer. He received his first four Grammy nominations in 2003, with two nominations for being a part of “Crazy in Love” by Beyoncé featuring Jay-Z and “Where is the Love” by the Black Eyed Peas featuring Justin Timberlake, both of which were up for Record of the Year. He was also nominated for his own work in the Best Engineered Album, Non-Classical for the Black Eyed Peas’ Elephunk. He won Best R&B Album that year on Beyoncé’s Dangerously in Love. The following year he was nominated again for Album of the Year on Usher’s Confessions.

Throughout this period, Maserati worked mostly with analogue consoles rather than digital tools. This required enormous amounts of space and specialized equipment. To fit it all in, Maserati built his own studio, Una Volta, in a barn in upstate New York. In 2008, he began working with his long-time collaborator Jason Mraz on the album We Sing. We Dance. We Steal Things, for which Maserati was nominated for a Grammy in Best Engineered Album, Non-Classical.

Los Angeles 
While his upstate barn provided the needed space for his equipment, Maserati disliked being so far from the city and the intimate collaborations of the studios. Around the same time, the music scene was decamping from New York to the West Coast. In 2010, Maserati moved to Los Angeles where he was able to get large amounts of space while still being within the city. However, he left most of his bulky analogue equipment in New York, which pushed him to adopt more of the digital equipment for mixing and automation.

In 2011, Maserati and songwriter Stefan Skarbek co-founded Mirrorball Entertainment, LLC in North Hollywood. Maserati worked with studio designer and acoustician Martin Pilchner to create modular studios in which each room could be redesigned to meet the specific needs of the production team renting the space. Maserati and Skarbek offered their production services in the space, allowing whole albums to be produced, published, and recorded on site. The integrated approach had Maserati directly mixing major tracks and overseeing the remaining tracks mixed by his assistants and mentees. Maserati is a client with Pulse Recording.

Grammy Awards 
Winner

2003 Best Contemporary R&B Album: Beyoncé Dangerously in Love

Nominee

2003 Record of the Year: The Black Eyed Peas “Where is the Love”

2003 Record of the Year: Beyoncé “Crazy in Love”

2003 Best Engineered Album, Non-Classical: The Black Eyed Peas, Elephunk

2004 Album of the Year: Usher Confessions

2008 Best Engineered Album, Non-Classical: Jason Mraz We Sing. We Dance. We Steal Things

2012 Best Engineered Album, Non-Classical: Jason Mraz Love is a Four Letter Word

2013 Record of the Year: Robin Thicke “Blurred Lines”

2014 Album of the Year: Beyoncé Beyoncé

2016 Album of the Year: Beyoncé Lemonade

2017 Best Engineered Album, Non-Classical: K. Flay Every Where is Some Where

Selected discography

References

External links
Official site
Waves Audio interview with Tony Maserati
Slate Digital interview with Tony Maserati
Sound on Sound review of Waves Maserati Plugins
Tony Maserati mixing Life and Love

American audio engineers
American record producers
Mixing engineers
Berklee College of Music alumni
Grammy Award winners
Latin Grammy Award winners
Living people
Year of birth missing (living people)